Atlantic-Haus is an 88 m high-rise office building in the St. Pauli district of Hamburg. Designed by Munich-based architect Thomas Herzog and completed in 2007, the Atlantic-Haus is part of a cluster of high-rises at Hamburg's Hafenkrone, an area between the St. Pauli Piers and St. Pauli's Reeperbahn district.

See also 

 List of tallest buildings in Hamburg
 List of tallest buildings in Germany

References

External links 

 official site 

Skyscrapers in Hamburg
Buildings and structures in Hamburg-Mitte
Office buildings completed in 2007
Skyscraper office buildings in Germany